Johannes Casper Kirsten (born 1 December 1993) is a South African rugby union professional player for the  in Super Rugby. His regular position is lock or flanker.
Kirsten now plays his rugby for Exeter chiefs in the English Premiership.

Career

2012–13

Kirsten was never involved in provincials schools competitions like the annual Craven Week competition, but he joined the Blue Bulls Academy in Pretoria after finishing school. He made eight appearances for the  side during the 2012 Under-19 Provincial Championship as they finished second on the log to qualify for the semi-finals.

Kirsten made his first class debut for the  during the 2013 Vodacom Cup.

In 2013, Kirsten was selected in the South Africa Under-20 team that attempted to retain the IRB Junior World Championship title that they won in 2012. Kirsten didn't feature in their opening match of the competition as they beat the United States 97–0. He was named on the bench for their next match against England, but failed to make an appearance in their 31–24 victory. He did, however, feature in their final pool match against hosts France, coming on as a replacement for the final ten minutes of a 26–19 victory which ensured South Africa finished top of their pool and qualified to the semi-finals. However, that proved to be Kirsten's only involvement in the tournament, as he sustained a fractured cheekbone during a training session, which ruled him out of the remainder of the tournament. In his absence, South Africa lost their semi-final match 17–18 to Wales before clinching third spot in the competition by beating New Zealand 41–34 to win their fourth third-place play-off match in six years.

Kirsten returned to domestic action with the  side and made nine appearances for them during the 2013 Under-21 Provincial Championship. He missed out on the title play-off matches, though, as his side fell short once again, losing 23–30 to s in the final.

2014–

In 2014, Kirsten represented Pretoria-based university side  in the 2014 Varsity Cup, which ended in disappointment as they finished in sixth spot to miss out on the semi-finals. Having previously played as a lock, Kirsten started their match against  as a flanker and remained in this position for the Blue Bulls U21s in the 2014 Under-21 Provincial Championship. He started thirteen of their fourteen matches in the competition and got a hat-trick of tries in their match against  in a 143–0 victory on the opening day of the competition.

He was named in the  Currie Cup squad for the first time in 2015 and was named on the bench for their Round Three match against .

Personal life

The brothers were both at the Blue Bulls between 2012 and 2014, but they didn't play together in the senior team at any stage before Frik's retirement in 2014 with a neck injury.

External links
 Blue Bulls Player Profile
 itsrugby.co.uk Profile

References

South African rugby union players
Living people
1993 births
Rugby union players from Johannesburg
Rugby union locks
Rugby union flankers
Rugby union number eights
Blue Bulls players
South Africa Under-20 international rugby union players